The Ulster Senior League is a league competition for the first teams of men's hockey clubs affiliated to the Ulster Hockey Union of Hockey Ireland.

Formation

At a Special General Meeting of the Union held on 15 October 1897 in the Royal Avenue Hotel, Belfast, the clubs present resolved to form the Ulster Senior League. Eight teams participated in the first season: Antrim, Ards, Cliftonville, King's (Liverpool) Regiment, Lisburn, North Down, North Staffordshire Regiment and Ulster

Current composition of the Senior League

In 2022–23, there are 10 clubs in the Ulster Senior League season.

Early format

From its formation until 1953 entry to the Ulster Senior League could only be obtained by application to the Ulster Hockey Union. The applicant club would then have to be successful in a vote amongst the Senior Clubs. The size of the Senior League varied between seven competing clubs in the 1900s to as many as eighteen in the late 1920s. With eighteen teams it was necessary to play the league in two pools with the winners of the pools playing a Test Match to decide that year's league champions.

1953 reorganisation

In 1953 the eight team Senior League amalgamated with the eight team Qualifying League. There was no realignment of teams at this time, the only difference was the renaming of the two leagues as Senior League Section A (the old Senior League) and Senior League Section B (the old Qualifying League). Teams did not change Sections during this period and no teams were promoted or relegated to or from the Senior League.

At the end of each league season the winner of Section A played the winner of Section B in a Test Match to decide the winner of the Keightley Cup. The loser of the Test Match was awarded the Ireland's Saturday Night Cup. During this period the trophy was always won by the Section A winner.

1958 reorganisation

Prior to the start of the 1957–58 season, the Council of the Ulster Branch made a controversial decision. Portrush, who had finished bottom of Section A in 1956–57 were demoted to Section B. Parkview, the winners of Section B in 1956–57, were moved to Section A. This signalled the intention of the League to move to Promotion and Relegation. A report was commissioned by the Council of the Ulster Branch to establish new league structures.

The report and debate lead to the league reorganising to allow for promotion and relegation prior to the start of the 1958–59 season. There were eight teams in each league section. A Qualifying League in two sections provided two lower rungs for the league, with a further Intermediate section below that. The formation of the sections again proved controversial, as some clubs were not placed in the section that their previous seasons standing would merit. In particular, it was reported that Saintfield (Intermediate A) had finished above four clubs in 1957–58 that were placed in Qualifying B.

1969 reorganisation

At the end of the 1968–69 season the Senior League expanded from eight to ten teams and was renamed as Senior League Section 1. The remaining six Qualifying League 'A' were joined by the top four teams from Qualifying 'B' to form a ten team league known as Senior League Section 2. All remaining club first teams were entered in the Intermediate League. In season 1975–76 Section 2 was increased to 12 teams.

Membership of the two Senior League Sections at the start of the 1969–70 season was as follows

2001 reorganisation

In 2001 Section 1 was reduced to eight teams, and was renamed as the Premier League. Section 2 remained with twelve teams and was renamed as Senior 1. The Intermediate League was renamed as Senior 2, with all remaining teams placed in this section.

The top three teams in the Premier League at the end of the season qualify for the All-Ireland Club Championship.

2015 reorganisation

The top four teams departed for the new Irish Hockey League (IHL) and the league reduced from three divisions to two. The League champions now qualify for the Provincial play-offs where they compete for promotion to the IHL.

2017 reorganisation

Four teams dropped into junior hockey and the two divisions were amalgamated into a single Premier League of fourteen teams.

2018 reorganisation

The Intermediate League was revived.

Trophies

 Winners of the Premier League are awarded the Keightley Cup.
 Winners of Senior 1 were awarded the Ireland's Saturday Night Cup.
 Winners of Senior 2 were awarded the Cliftonville Cup.

League winners and relegated clubs

2018–19 on

Key: 

 1 – Irish Hockey League Second Division formed in 2018-19 with teams competing in addition to the Ulster Premier League. Prommotion to the Irish Premier League is via the IHL Second Division.
 2 – 2019–20 Season abandoned due to coronavirus pandemic. Cookstown declared Premier League champions using percentage equalisation method. No promotion to or relegation from Irish Hockey League. Relegation to and promotion from Intermediate League based on percentage equalisation method.

2017–18

Key: 

 1 – 2017–18 Cliftonville relegated to revived Intermediate League (and changed name to CIYMS). Other teams joining Intermediate League were Armagh, Ballymena, Ballynahinch, Down, Parkview, PSNI, Portrush and Saintfield.

2015–16 to 2016–17

Key: 

 1 – 2016–17 Cookstown promoted to Irish Hockey League after winning the promotion/relegation play-off.
 2 – 2016–17 Annadale promoted to Irish Hockey League after winning the Provincial play-offs.
 3 – 2016–17 Campbellians dropped into junior hockey.
 4 – 2016–17 Antrim, Bangor, Cliftonville and Queen's University promoted alongside South Antrim. Armagh, Ballynahinch and Portrush dropped into junior hockey.
 5 – 2015–16 Instonians promoted to Irish Hockey League after winning the Provincial play-offs.

2010–11 to 2014–15

Key: 

 1 – 2014–15 Banbridge along with Annadale, Cookstown and Lisnagarvey joined the Irish Hockey League for the 2015–16 season.
 2 – 2014–15 Mossley, North Down, Portadown, Raphoe and South Antrim promoted.
 3 – 2014–15 Armagh, Ballynahinch and Cliftonville promoted. (Ballymena, Down, Larne, Newcastle, Parkview and Saintfield were relegated to the Junior League.)
 4 – 2012–13 Cliftonville were also promoted.
 5 – 2008–09 Raphoe were not relegated due to increase in number of teams in premier league to ten.
 6 – 2008–09 North Down were also promoted to enable increase of premier league to ten teams.

2000–01 to 1969–70

Key: 

 1 – 2000–01 Bangor won Section 2 but lost a Promotion Playoff
 2 – 1997–98 South Antrim were runners-up and gained promotion when Holywood '87 folded.
 3 – 1996–97 Promotion and relegation suspended.
 4 – 1978–79 Belfast YMCA won League after 3–1 victory in Test Match against Instonians.
 5 – 1977–78 Promotion and relegation between Section 1 and 2 suspended because of Ireland's participation in the Hockey World Cup in Argentina.
 6 – 1969–70 Promotion and relegation between Section 1 and 2 suspended.

1968–69 to 1957–58

KEY
 1 – 1967–68 Old Bleach(Qual. A) folded after this season. As a result, East Antrim were not relegated. In addition Holywood(Int. A) folded.
 2 – 1965–66 Lissara renamed as Crossgar at the end of this season.
 3 – 1964–65 Lisnagarvey won League after Test Match with Cliftonville
 4 – 1964–65 Lisburn Old Boys renamed as Friends School Old Boys at the end of this season.
 5 – 1963–64 Montalto withdrew from League during season. No relegation from Qualifying B.

1956–57 to formation

 1956–57
 1955–56 Belfast YMCA (Won Test Match against Parkview)
 1954–55 Lisnagarvey (Won Test Match against Parkview)
 1953–54 Lisnagarvey (Won Test Match against Down)
 1952–53 Lisnagarvey
 1951–52 Lisnagarvey
 1950–51 Lisnagarvey
 1949–50 Lisnagarvey (Won Test Match 1–0 v Parkview)
 1948–49 Parkview (Won Test Match 2–1 after extra time v Antrim)
 1947–48
 1946–47
 1945–46
 1944–45 Lisnagarvey
 1943–44
 1942–43
 1941–42
 1940–41
 1939–40
 1938–39 Lisnagarvey
 1937–38 Lisnagarvey
 1936–37 North Down
 1935–36 North Down
 1934–35 North Down
 1933–34 Lisnagarvey (Won Test Match 3–1 v North Down) (2 section Senior League)
 1932–33 North Down
 1931–32 North Down
 1930–31 Cliftonville
 1929–30 Antrim
 1928–29 Cliftonville
 1927–28 Antrim
 1926–27 Antrim
 1925–26 Banbridge (Won Test Match 3–2 v Lisnagarvey)
 1924–25 Lisnagarvey
 1923–24 East Antrim (Won Test Match 4–3 v Banbridge)
 1922–23
 1921–22
 1920–21 Antrim (Won Test Match 3–1 v Banbridge)
 1919–20
 1918–19 Not Played
 1917–18 Not Played
 1916–17 Not Played
 1915–16 Not Played
 1914–15 Not Played
 1913–14 Banbridge
 1912–13 Banbridge
 1911–12 Queen's University
 1910–11 Banbridge
 1909–10 Banbridge (after a Test Match)
 1908–09 Banbridge (after a Test Match)
 1907–08 Antrim
 1906–07 Cliftonville (after a Test Match)
 1905–06 Malone
 1904–05 Antrim (after a Test Match)
 1903–04 Banbridge
 1902–03 Antrim
 1901–02 Banbridge
 1900–01 Antrim
 1899-1900 North Down
 1898–99
 1897–98 Antrim

Sources

Information gathered from Belfast Newsletter and Ireland Saturday Night

 
Field hockey leagues in Ireland
Field hockey leagues in the United Kingdom
1897 establishments in Ireland
Sports leagues established in 1897